Kunais Valley is a valley located in the northern areas of Pakistan in the Ghanche District of Gilgit Baltistan. The valley consists of a number of small villages.

Populated places in Ghanche District